Ardern (pronounced  ,   or  ) is a surname of English origin. It most commonly refers to Jacinda Ardern (born 1980), the 40th prime minister of New Zealand.

Other notable people with the surname include:

 Barry Ardern (born 1946), Canadian footballer
 Lawrence Ardern (1523–1570), English politician
 Ross Ardern (born 1954), New Zealand diplomat and the father of Jacinda Ardern
 Shane Ardern (born 1960), New Zealand politician

Jacinda Ardern